The SCINEMA International Science Film Festival is an Australian film festival celebrating international science-related drama and documentary films. The festival was founded with the aim of forging links between the sciences and the arts.  SCINEMA accepts entries from all over the world.  It is a program of Australia's Science Channel, operated by The Royal Institution of Australia.

Background 
Founded in 2000 by Rebecca Scott and Damian Harris, the first festival in 2001 played only in Canberra (at the Center Cinema) and was well attended, with some sold-out performances. Originally hosted by CSIRO, the festival grew steadily over the 2000s.

After a brief hiatus (there was no festival in 2014-15), SCINEMA found a new home with the Royal Institution of Australia.  The 2016 Festival received over 1,300 submissions from over 80 countries, and premiered in cities around Australia on 18 June 2016.  The festival also hosts a community screening program as part of National Science Week, where community groups and schools can register to run their own screening program.   In 2016 over 240 events were held around Australia, with a screening even held on the Davis Station in Antarctica. 

In 2017, over 37,000 people participated in the festival which was screened at 317 events around Australia.  One reviewer said of the festival "The most noticeable thing about the films is that, collectively and individually, they are less explicitly about science and more about us. These are very human stories about how we engage with the world — with the things in it, and with each other."

Past Award Winners

References

External links 
 SCINEMA Film Festival
 "Scinema's Journey" article in the Age

Documentary film festivals in Australia
Fantasy and horror film festivals
Science fiction film festivals